BET: Uncut is a defunct music video block program that aired on BET from 2000 until 2006. The videos contained within the show featured mature content, including highly sexualized imagery. The content assured the program a permanent TV Parental Guidelines rating of TV-MA, with a 'viewer discretion' advisory leading into the start of and each segment of the show. Uncut mainly aired on Fridays through Sundays at 3 a.m. EST.

Its last episode aired on July 7, 2006 and was hosted by Jermaine Dupri. BET announced the cancellation of the show on July 25, 2006.

Controversy
While the videos were lightly censored, the show's content has been the focus of controversy, with Nelly's video for "Tip Drill" by far the video with the most outcry among Uncut videos. For example, the Associated Press has reported that even some hip-hop artists such as Big Boi of Outkast thought the show was distasteful and could constitute soft porn.  Likewise, individuals affiliated with historically black institutions such as Spelman College and Essence Magazine stated that the erotic imagery of the show falls outside of acceptable standards. Regardless, the show maintained a degree of popularity.

False 'return'
On August 5, 2015, BET put out a release announcing the block's return on August 11. The 'relaunch' of the series proved to be merely a publicity stunt (especially as August 11 was a Tuesday evening compared to the weekend berth Uncut aired in the past), and after an intro with the imagery of Uncut, the actual series in the timeslot was the premiere of the BET revival of Punk'd, which had been announced earlier in the year.

Media spotlight
The show was mentioned by rapper Joe Budden on the first verse his debut single "Pump It Up".

References

Uncut
2001 American television series debuts
2006 American television series endings
2000s American music television series